is a Japanese ultramarathon and marathon runner. He is the current male 100 km run world record holder with a time of 6:09:14. He set the record on June 24, 2018, at the Lake Saroma Ultramarathon, an official World Athletics race held annually in Hokkaido, Japan. Kazami bettered Takahiro Sunada's 1998 record by almost four minutes. His personal best time for the marathon is 2:13:13 (Tokyo Marathon, Tokyo on March 1, 2020),

References

External links
 

1983 births
Living people
Komazawa University alumni
Japanese male marathon runners
Japanese ultramarathon runners
World Athletics record holders
Male ultramarathon runners